Shadrino is a rural locality (a village) in Krasnoselskoye Rural Settlement, Yuryev-Polsky District, Vladimir Oblast, Russia. The population was 7 as of 2010.

Geography 
Shadrino is located on the Voshenka River, 14 km south of Yuryev-Polsky (the district's administrative centre) by road. Ternovka is the nearest rural locality.

References 

Rural localities in Yuryev-Polsky District